Vladimir Beliak (born 16 August 1973) is a Russian-Israeli politician. He is currently a member of the Knesset for Yesh Atid. He is a former consultant and (municipal) director.

Biography
He was born in Kemerovo in the Soviet Union, which later became a part of modern Russian Federation. He immigrated to Israel in 1998.

He was a replacement for former Blue and White MK Avi Nissenkorn, who left Blue and White to join Ron Huldai's The Israelis party. Beliak was placed fifteenth on Yesh Atid's list for the 2021 elections and retained his seat in the Knesset as the party won seventeen seats.

References

External links

1973 births
Living people
21st-century Israeli civil servants
Israeli Jews
Israeli management consultants
Israeli people of Russian-Jewish descent
Jewish Israeli politicians
Members of the 23rd Knesset (2020–2021)
Members of the 24th Knesset (2021–2022)
Members of the 25th Knesset (2022–)
People from Kemerovo
Russian emigrants to Israel
Russian Jews
Yesh Atid politicians